The Bishop of Killaloe and Clonfert (Full title: Bishop of Killaloe and Kilfenora with Clonfert and Kilmacduagh) was the Ordinary of the Church of Ireland diocese of Killaloe and Clonfert; comprising all of County Clare and part of counties of Tipperary, Galway and Roscommon, Republic of Ireland.

History
Under the Church Temporalities (Ireland) Act 1833, the Episcopal see was a union of the bishoprics of Killaloe and Kilfenora and Clonfert and Kilmacduagh which were united in 1834. In 1976, Killaloe and Clonfert was united with Limerick, Ardfert and Aghadoe to form the united bishopric of Bishop of Limerick and Killaloe.

List of Bishops of Killaloe and Clonfert

References

 
Diocese of Limerick and Killaloe
Killaloe and Clonfert
Killaloe and Clonfert
Religion in County Clare
Religion in County Galway
1834 establishments in the United Kingdom